Victoria is a town in the western part of Brașov County, Transylvania, Romania, near the Făgăraș Mountains. It had a population of 7,067 at the 2011 census.

In 1939, the Romanian state signed a contract with the German company Ferrostaal of Essen to build a factory (called "Ucea") on the site of what is now Victoria. The contract was canceled after Romania declared war on Germany in 1944, during World War II.

The building of the town began in 1949 and it had the provisional names of "Colonia Ucea" and "Ucea Roșie" (Red Ucea), only to be changed in November 1954 to Victoria.

Climate
Victoria has a warm-summer humid continental climate (Dfb in the Köppen climate classification).

Twin towns 
  Chevilly-Larue, France (1994)
  Utrechtse Heuvelrug, Netherlands (2005)
  Lariano, Italy (2007)

Natives
Cosmin Băcilă
Iulian Popa

References

External links

 www.orasulvictoria.ro

Monotowns in Romania
Populated places established in 1949
Populated places in Brașov County
Localities in Transylvania
Planned cities in Romania
Socialist planned cities
Towns in Romania